is a railway station located in the town of Happō, Akita Prefecture, Japan, operated by East Japan Railway Company (JR East).

Lines
Higashi-Hachimori Station  is served by the  Gonō Line, and is located 18.0 kilometers from the southern terminus of the line at Higashi-Noshiro Station.

Station layout
The station has one side platform serving a single bidirectional track.  The unattended station is managed from Noshiro Station.

History
The JGR became the JNR (Japan National Railways) after World War II. The station was renamed to its present name on October 1, 1959. With the privatization of the JNR on April 1, 1987, the station has been managed by JR East.

Surrounding area
 
 former Hachimori town hall

See also
List of railway stations in Japan

References

External links

JR East station information page 

Railway stations in Japan opened in 1926
Railway stations in Akita Prefecture
Gonō Line
Happō, Akita